"Living in the Background" is the title track and third single from Baltimora's debut album of the same name, and second released single in total. The song reached number 87 on the U.S. Billboard Hot 100. There was no video made for this single.

"Living in the Background" did not garner the same attention that their first single "Tarzan Boy" did.

Track listing
 Germany 12" Single 

 USA 12" Club Mix Promo Single 

 7" single 

 Remix U.S.A. 1986

Charts

References

1985 songs
Baltimora songs
Songs written by Maurizio Bassi
1986 singles
EMI Records singles
Manhattan Records singles